Statistics Surveys is an open-access electronic journal, founded in 2007, that is jointly sponsored by the American Statistical Association,  the Bernoulli Society, the Institute of Mathematical Statistics and the Statistical Society of Canada. It publishes review articles on topics of interest in statistics. Wendy L. Martinez serves as the coordinating editor.

External links
Official page

Mathematics journals
Statistics journals
Publications established in 2007
Institute of Mathematical Statistics academic journals
American Statistical Association academic journals